Chialli is a surname. Notable people with the surname include:

Giuseppe Chialli (1800–1839), Italian sculptor, brother of Vincenzo
Vincenzo Chialli (1787–1840), Italian painter